Daniel Thomas Lynd (born March 4, 1994) is an American soccer player who is currently an assistant coach for the Brockport Golden Eagles.

Career

College and amateur
Lynd played four years of college soccer at the University of Pittsburgh between 2012 and 2015.

Lynd also played with Premier Development League sides Pittsburgh Riverhounds U23.

Professional
Lynd signed his first professional deal with United Soccer League club Rochester Rhinos on April 22, 2016.

References

External links

 
 
 Brockport coaching bio

1994 births
Living people
People from Penfield, New York
American soccer players
Pittsburgh Panthers men's soccer players
Pittsburgh Riverhounds U23 players
Rochester New York FC players
Pittsburgh Riverhounds SC players
USL League Two players
USL Championship players
Soccer players from New York (state)
Association football goalkeepers
Brockport Golden Eagles men's soccer coaches